Andrews Bridge Historic District is a national historic district located at Colerain Township, Lancaster County, Pennsylvania. The district includes nine contributing buildings in the rural crossroads village of Andrews Bridge.  The buildings were built between 1800 and 1850 and are the old Roop's Hotel, a former mill also known as Dobbin's Store (c. 1800), four dwellings, and three barns.

It was listed on the National Register of Historic Places in 1978.

References

Historic districts in Lancaster County, Pennsylvania
Historic districts on the National Register of Historic Places in Pennsylvania
National Register of Historic Places in Lancaster County, Pennsylvania